The 2019 Tucson mayoral election was held on November 5, 2019. It saw the election of Regina Romero.

Nominations 
Primaries were held August 27, 2019. Three candidates ran in the Democratic primary, one official write-in ran in the Green primary, while none ran in either the Libertarian or Republican primaries.

Democratic primary

Candidates
Steve Farley, Arizona state senator, former Arizona state representative
Randi Dorman, developer
Regina Romero, Tucson city councilwoman

Polls

Not running in Democratic Primary

Results

Green primary

Libertarian primary

Republican primary
While both Frank Konarski and Sam Nagy filed paperwork to run for the Republican nomination, neither met the signature requirements to get on the ballot.

Independent candidates
Ed Ackerley, co-owner of Ackerley Advertising

Write-in
Al Pesqueira (identified as Republican), unqualified write-in, withdrew from race

General election
Regina Romero was elected the first-ever female mayor of Tucson, and the first Hispanic mayor of the city since the Latino Estevan Ochoa was mayor from 1875 to 1876.

This is the first time in over 30 years that Republicans have not run a candidate in an open-seat Tucson mayoral race.

References 

2019
Tucson
Tucson